Christopher Jon Hewison (born October 6, 1979) was an English cricketer. Born in Gateshead, Tyne and Wear, he was a right-handed batsman and a right-arm medium-pace bowler. He  also played occasional as a wicket-keeper. He played first-class and List A cricket for Nottinghamshire, and Durham CB during his four-year first-class career. Most recently, he has played Minor Counties Cricket for Northumberland.

External links
Chris Hewison at Cricket Archive 

1979 births
Living people
Cricketers from Gateshead
Durham Cricket Board cricketers
English cricketers
Northumberland cricketers
Nottinghamshire cricketers